Giuseppe Caronia (15 May 1884 – 15 January 1977) was an Italian politician.

Caronia was born in San Cipirello. He represented the Christian Democracy party in the Constituent Assembly of Italy from 1946 to 1948 and in the Chamber of Deputies from 1948 to 1958. He nominated Pope Pius XII for a Nobel Peace Prize in 1948. In 1996 he was recognized as Righteous Among the Nations by the Yad Vashem.

References

Bibliography
Italo Farnetani, Pediatri e medici alla Costituente, Editeam, Cento (FE), 2006. 
Giulio Andreotti, Caronia visto da vicino da Andreotti , «Grand'Angolo di Edit-Symposia. Pediatria e Neonatologia» 2006; 13 (1), pp. 21-22.
G. Roberto Burgio, Caronia: lo scienziato-rettore visto da un Maestro , «Grand'Angolo di Edit-Symposia. Pediatria e Neonatologia» 2006; 13 (1), pp. 18-20.
Italo Farnetani, Il ruolo del pediatra Giuseppe Caronia "giusto fra le nazioni" , «Grand'Angolo di Edit-Symposia. Pediatria e Neonatologia» 2005; 12 (2), p. 39.
Italo Farnetani, I venticinque pediatri, decorati con la Medaglia d'oro della sanità, hanno scritto la storia della Repubblica, prefazione del ministro della salute Beatrice Lorenzin, «Pediatria Preventiva & Sociale» 2016; 11 (3), pp 10-21-  https://www.sipps.it/pdf/rivista/2016_03.pdf
 http://www.treccani.it/enciclopedia/giuseppe-caronia_(Dizionario-Biografico)/
Italo Farnetani, Francesca Farnetani, La top twelve della ricerca italiana, « Minerva Pediatrica» 2015; 67 (5): pp.437-450 .
Italo Farnetani, Qualche notazione di storia della pediatria, in margine alla V edizione di Pediatria Essenziale, Postfazione. In Burgio G.R.( (a cura di). Pediatria Essenziale. 5a Ed.  Milano: Edi-Ermes; 2012.  . vol. 2°, pp. 1757-1764.

External links
Legislature.camera.it

1884 births
1977 deaths
Politicians from the Province of Palermo
Christian Democracy (Italy) politicians
Members of the Constituent Assembly of Italy
Deputies of Legislature I of Italy
Deputies of Legislature II of Italy